Colomiers (Languedocien dialect: Colomièrs) is a commune in the Haute-Garonne department in the Occitania region in Southwestern France. With a population of 39,968 as of 2019, it is the largest suburb of the city of Toulouse, to which it is adjacent on the west side. Colomiers is part of Toulouse Métropole.

Demographics
The inhabitants of the commune are known as Columérins (masculine) or Columérines (feminine).

Transport
In 1971 it became the first area of France to offer zero-fare public transport, but had to cancel this project in 2016.

Education
There are nine public preschools (maternelles) and six public elementary schools. There are four public junior high schools (collèges): Léon Blum, Victor Hugo, Jean Jaurès, and Voltaire. There are two public senior high schools, Lycée International Victor Hugo and Lycée des Métiers de l'électrotechnique, de la maintenance et Chaudronnerie Eugène-Montel.

There is an international school in Colomiers (International School of Toulouse or IST) which is run by Airbus and which prepares for the International Baccalaureate, and, within the international lycée, a German school (Deutsche Schule Toulouse, DST). English 31, supported by Airbus, provides English-language tuition.

There is also a private preschool, elementary and middle school, Institution « Sainte-Thérèse ».

Sport
US Colomiers is a French rugby union club based in Colomiers.

See also
Communes of the Haute-Garonne department

References

External links

Official website 

Communes of Haute-Garonne